Mandi Lok Sabha constituency is one of the four Lok Sabha (parliamentary) constituencies in Himachal Pradesh state in northern India. Pratibha Singh, representing INC, won the last Lok Sabha byelection in 2021 from Mandi following the death of Ram Swaroop Sharma who won in 2019 general Lok Sabha election.

History 
Mandi Parliamentary constituency already emerged as a hot bed of politics where not only the BJP and the Congress will fight for their prestige, but is the only seat in the state where the Left front has popped up a candidate.
The constituency then was named as Mandi - Mahasu was represented by Rani Amrit Kaur of the erstwhile Patiala state and Sh Gopi Ram Mandi during 1952–57. In the Lok Sabha elections that followed in 1957, the seat was represented by Raja Joginder Sen of the erstwhile Mandi state, who represented the seat till 1962. In the following elections that year Raja Lalit Sen of Sundarnagar or the erstwhile Suket State was elected. He repeated his victory in the 1967 elections.

However, in period from 1977 to 1979, the constituency was represented by Ganga Singh who represented the Janata Party, which came to power at the centre immediately after the elections that followed the imposition of emergency in the country and the Congress, under Indira Gandhi was routed. He defeated Congress candidate Virbhadra Singh.

Then came along the man, who called himself the son-of-the-soil, Sukh Ram. He switched from state politics to the Parliament and won comfortably in 1985. In the next election, however, it was again another blue-blooded royal, Maheshwar Singh, scion of the erstwhile Kullu state who drubbed the son-of-the-soil at the polls.

But Sukh Ram bounced back and won again in 1994, but was expelled from the Congress a couple of years later, following the reported recovery of large amounts of cash from his residence. To re-establish his political dominion Sukh Ram floated Himachal Vikas Congress and came back into politics with a bang – winning five Assembly seats in 1998 along with wresting Shimla (reserved) parliamentary seat from the Congress in 1999. In 1998, Sukh Ram's HVC under an alliance with the BJP supported the candidature of Maheshwar Singh, who won easily. In 2004, Congress candidate Pratibha Singh defeated Maheshwar Singh.  In the last Parliament elections 2009, Congress candidate Virbhadra Singh defeated Maheshwar Singh by a very small gap.

Vidhan Sabha segments
Mandi Lok Sabha constituency presently comprises the following 17 Vidhan Sabha (legislative assembly) segments:

Members of Lok Sabha

^ bye-poll

Election results

2021 Bye-election

2019 Election

2014 election

2013 By-election

2009 election

2004 election

1999 election

1998 election

1996 election

1991 election

1989 election

1984 election

1980 election

1977 election

1971 election

1967 election

1962 election

1957 election

1951 election

 
 

Stations and 2 Auxiliary polling stations are being set up in the Four Parliamentary Constituencies for Lok Sabha Elections – 2009 in the State. 1259 Pole been declared as sensitive while 708 polling Stations have been classified as Hypersensitive to ensure free and fair elections in the State. The maximum number of Hyper Sensitive Polling Stations is 197 in Kangra District, he added. However, the largest number of Polling Stations was 1921 in 2-Mandi Parliamentary Constituency, including the Auxiliary Polling Station in Jogindernagar Assembly Constituency.

See also
 List of Constituencies of the Lok Sabha

References

Lok Sabha constituencies in Himachal Pradesh
Mandi district
Chamba district
Lahaul and Spiti district
Kullu district
Kinnaur district
Shimla district